Anthony Braemar Ineson (born 23 April 1950 in Christchurch) is a former field hockey player from New Zealand, who was a member of the national team that won the gold medal at the 1976 Summer Olympics in Montreal.

Ineson was the captain of the 1976 gold medal winning hockey team. His brother Chris was a New Zealand representative at the 1972 Summer Olympics.

Ineson was elected, with the rest of the Gold medal winning team, to the New Zealand Sports Hall of Fame in 1990.

References

External links
 

New Zealand male field hockey players
Olympic field hockey players of New Zealand
Field hockey players at the 1976 Summer Olympics
Field hockey players from Christchurch
1950 births
Living people
Olympic medalists in field hockey
Medalists at the 1976 Summer Olympics
Olympic gold medalists for New Zealand
20th-century New Zealand people
21st-century New Zealand people